Elofsson is a surname. Notable people with the surname include:

Gustaf Elofsson (1897–1971), Swedish politician
Jonas Elofsson (born 1979), ice hockey player
Jörgen Elofsson (born 1962), Swedish songwriter
Per Elofsson (born 1977), Swedish cross-country skier
Tomas Elofsson (born 1977), guitarist and songwriter

See also
Olofsson